The 1914–15 Luxembourg National Division was the fifth season of top level association football in Luxembourg.

Overview
It was contested by 11 teams, and Sporting Club Luxembourg won the championship.

Group A

|}

Group B

|}

Group C

|}

Group D

|}

Group E

|}

Playoffs for the championship

Final

References
Luxembourg - List of final tables (RSSSF)

1914-15
1914–15 in European association football leagues
Nat